Prince Maurice of the Netherlands, Prince of Orange-Nassau (Willem Frederik Maurits Alexander Hendrik Karel; 15 September 1843 – 4 June 1850), was the second son of King William III of the Netherlands and his first spouse, Sophie of Württemberg.

When Prince Maurice suffered from meningitis, Queen Sophie wanted to consult another physician for a second opinion, but King William III refused and the child died. Their already strained relationship fell apart almost completely, as Sophie blamed William for Maurice's death. 

The embittered queen wrote to one of her friends:

Nevertheless, the couple had one more son, Prince Alexander, born a year after Maurice's death.

Ancestry

1843 births
1850 deaths
Dutch members of the Dutch Reformed Church
House of Orange-Nassau
Burials in the Royal Crypt at Nieuwe Kerk, Delft
Princes of Orange-Nassau
Royalty and nobility who died as children
Sons of kings